Agrostemma is a genus of annual plants in the family Caryophyllaceae, containing the species known as corncockles. Its best-known member is A. githago, the common corncockle, which is a native of Europe. The species is a weed of cereals and other crops, probably with a centre of origin in the eastern Mediterranean. It occurs as a weed worldwide, but is declining in its native range because of improved seed cleaning. Agrostemma gracile, the slender corncockle, is only found in central Greece near the city of Farsala. Corncockle is an attractive plant, and its seeds are still commercially available to gardeners.

Selected species
Agrostemma brachyloba 	Hammer, narrow corncockle
Agrostemma githago L., common corncockle, corn-pink
Agrostemma gracile

References

Caryophyllaceae
Caryophyllaceae genera